Weight is an EP by Canadian rock band The Kindred. It was announced on June 21, 2017 on the band's Facebook page as well as the Sumerian Records Facebook page along with the single "Saint". It is advertised as part 1 of 2 of their new full-length album.

Track listing

Personnel
The Kindred
Johnny McArthur – vocals
Ben John Davis – guitar
Steve Rennie – guitar
Kenny Saunders – drums
Eric Stone – bass guitar
Matt Young – keyboard

Production
Produced by Dean Hadjichristou
Mastered by Brett Zilahi

References

The Kindred (band) albums
2017 albums